William Walther (born February 5, 1906, date of death unknown) was a German boxer who competed in the 1928 Summer Olympics.

In 1928, he was eliminated in the first round of the welterweight class after losing his fight to Leonard Hall of Rhodesia.

External links
Part 3 the boxing tournament
William Walther's profile at Sports Reference.com

1906 births
Year of death missing
Welterweight boxers
Olympic boxers of Germany
Boxers at the 1928 Summer Olympics
German male boxers